Prochoreutis alpinoides is a moth of the family Choreutidae. It is known from Shaanxi, China.

The wingspan is about 11 mm. The head, thorax and tegula are olive. The forewings are triangular and the termen weakly oblique. They are dark olive, with three white costal marks, two discal white points, and a slender transverse metallic fascia from the second mark. Their single white and metallic scales are diffused through the wing area. White scales are mainly found in the dorsal and medial part, metallic scales in the subcostal, subapical and terminal parts. The hindwing is concolours with the forewing but lighter, with a comparatively long submarginal white stripe.

Etymology
The specific name is derived from the Latin postfix oides (meaning like) and Prochoreutis alpina, indicating the similarity of the two species.

References

External links
lepiforum.de

Prochoreutis